Jérôme Declercq (30 October 1899 – 12 May 1939) was a Belgian racing cyclist. He rode in the 1930 Tour de France.

References

1899 births
1939 deaths
Belgian male cyclists
Place of birth missing